Cheimoptena is a genus of moths in the family Geometridae.

Species
 Cheimoptena pennigera Danilevsky, 1969

References
 Cheimoptena at Markku Savela's Lepidoptera and Some Other Life Forms
 Natural History Museum Lepidoptera genus database

Ennominae